Richard Maitland (1496–1586) was a Scottish poet.

Richard Maitland may also refer to:

Sir Richard Maitland, 1st Baronet (died 1677) of the Maitland baronets
Sir Richard Maitland, 2nd Baronet (died 1679) of the Maitland baronets
 Richard Maitland, 4th Earl of Lauderdale (1653–1695), Scottish politician
 Richard Maitland (British Army officer) (c. 1714–1763), officer of the Royal Artillery